Drotebanol (Oxymethebanol) is a morphinan derivative that acts as an opioid agonist. It was invented by Sankyo Company in Japan during the 1970s. It is synthesised from thebaine. 

Drotebanol has powerful antitussive (cough suppressant) effects, and is around 10x more potent than codeine in producing this effect. It also has analgesic effects several times stronger than codeine, but weaker than morphine. In animal studies it was found to be moderately addictive and produced limited physical dependence, but not as severe as that seen with morphine or pethidine.  It was previously marketed for human use under the brand name Metebanyl, although it is now no longer used in medicine.

It is currently a Schedule I Narcotic controlled substance in the United States with a DEA ACSCN of 9335 and an annual aggregate manufacturing quota of zero.

References 

Diols
Antitussives
Morphinans
Mu-opioid receptor agonists
Phenol ethers
Semisynthetic opioids
Cyclohexanols